Thomas Kirkby may refer to:

Thomas Kirkby (MP for Kingston upon Hull), 1391-1411
Thomas Kirkby (MP for Totnes), MP in May 1421 for Totnes

See also
Thomas Kirby (disambiguation)